Janus August Garde (1823 – 1893) was Governor-General of the Danish West Indies from 25 September 1872 to 23 March 1881. He had a break in service from 5 January 1876 to 16 September 1876, when he went back to Denmark to gather knowledge on the latest of sugar processing. His absence was expected to be only few weeks, but lasted over eight months. Carl Anton Frederik Christian Hattensen (1828-1884) was acting Governor-General during Garde's absence.   

Governor Garde is credited for establishing an education system on the islands, such the St. Thomas College in 1875, increasing the number of police and improving the appearance of the capital as well as the facilities of the harbor of St. Thomas.

The 1878 St. Croix labor riot, one of the most wide spread unrest of the 1800s on the Danish West Indies, were managed during his time as a governor as well.

References

External links 
 History of Virgin Islands, the most complete catalog of governors of the Danish West Indies.
 Private archive of Governor Janus August Garde: Files (1871 - 1874), West Indian Government.

Governors of the Danish West Indies
1823 births
1893 deaths
19th century in the Danish West Indies
19th-century Danish politicians